The Northern Ireland Ladies Open was a professional golf tournament on the Ladies European Tour (LET) held in Northern Ireland.

A Northern Ireland tournament was a fixture on the LET schedule since the tour's inception in 1979. In 1984 the tournament featured on the LPGA Tour along with the Women's British Open. The latest installment, in 2007, took place at Templepatrick Golf and Country Club near Belfast, with a prize fund of €200,000. As well as the LET professionals, the field featured 12-year-old local twins Lisa and Leona Maguire.

Winners

Source:

See also
Ladies Irish Open
Northern Ireland Open

References

External links
Ladies European Tour

Northern Ireland Ladies Open
Former LPGA Tour events
Golf tournaments in Northern Ireland
Women's sport in Northern Ireland